Khaled Al-Assaf (born 8 March 1964) is a Kuwaiti swimmer. He competed in the men's 100 metre freestyle at the 1984 Summer Olympics.

References

External links
 

1964 births
Living people
Kuwaiti male swimmers
Olympic swimmers of Kuwait
Swimmers at the 1984 Summer Olympics
Place of birth missing (living people)